Sin Perdón is a Chilean punk rock band formed in Santiago, Chile, in 1998.

Band members

Former members
Ítalo Valentino – drums
Claudio Lobos – bass

Discography

Studio albums
Viejas & Nuevas tragedias (2003)
Sin Perdón (2006)
El Valle Condena (2009)
Animal (2012)
Todo va a estar bien (2013)

EP's
El Comienzo de la Lucha (1999)
De Amor y Tragedias (2000)
Lágrimas y Desconsuelos (2001)

References

External links

Musical groups established in 1998
Chilean punk rock groups
Pop punk groups
Emo musical groups